In mathematics, the Hilbert cube, named after David Hilbert, is a topological space that provides an instructive example of some ideas in topology. Furthermore, many interesting topological spaces can be embedded in the Hilbert cube; that is, can be viewed as subspaces of the Hilbert cube (see below).

Definition

The Hilbert cube is best defined as the topological product of the intervals  for  That is, it is a cuboid of countably infinite dimension, where the lengths of the edges in each orthogonal direction form the sequence 

The Hilbert cube is homeomorphic to the product of countably infinitely many copies of the unit interval   In other words, it is topologically indistinguishable from the unit cube of countably infinite dimension.

If a point in the Hilbert cube is specified by a sequence  with  then a homeomorphism to the infinite dimensional unit cube is given by

The Hilbert cube as a metric space

It is sometimes convenient to think of the Hilbert cube as a metric space, indeed as a specific subset of a separable Hilbert space (that is, a Hilbert space with a countably infinite Hilbert basis).
For these purposes, it is best not to think of it as a product of copies of  but instead as

as stated above, for topological properties, this makes no difference.
That is, an element of the Hilbert cube is an infinite sequence

that satisfies

Any such sequence belongs to the Hilbert space  so the Hilbert cube inherits a metric from there. One can show that the topology induced by the metric is the same as the product topology in the above definition.

Properties

As a product of compact Hausdorff spaces, the Hilbert cube is itself a compact Hausdorff space as a result of the Tychonoff theorem.
The compactness of the Hilbert cube can also be proved without the axiom of choice by constructing a continuous function from the usual Cantor set onto the Hilbert cube.

In  no point has a compact neighbourhood (thus,  is not locally compact).
The Hilbert cube shows that this is not the case.

The Hilbert cube is a convex set, whose span is the whole space, but whose interior is empty. This situation is impossible in finite dimensions. The tangent cone to the cube at the zero vector is the whole space.

Every subset of the Hilbert cube inherits from the Hilbert cube the properties of being both metrizable (and therefore T4) and second countable. It is more interesting that the converse also holds: Every second countable T4 space is homeomorphic to a subset of the Hilbert cube.

Every Gδ-subset of the Hilbert cube is a Polish space, a topological space homeomorphic to a separable and complete metric space. Conversely, every Polish space is homeomorphic to a Gδ-subset of the Hilbert cube.

See also

Notes

References

Further reading
 

Topological spaces
Polytopes
Infinity
Cube